Cornellà Centre, also simply known as Cornellà, is a Rodalies de Catalunya and Barcelona Metro station, as well as Trambaix tram stop. It is located in the city centre of the Cornellà de Llobregat municipality, to the south-west of Barcelona, in Catalonia, Spain.

It has been the southern terminus of Barcelona Metro line 5 since 1983, when it was opened.

The original name of the Barcelona Metro station was simply "Cornellà", but it was renamed "Cornellà Centre" due to the fact that Gavarra and Sant Ildefons stations, all of them on Barcelona Metro line 5, are also located in the Cornellà de Llobregat municipality.

References

External links

Cornellà Centre metro station at Trenscat.com
Cornellà train station at Trenscat.com

Railway stations in Spain opened in 2004
Transport in Cornellà de Llobregat
Railway stations in Baix Llobregat
Barcelona Metro line 5 stations
Trambaix stops
Railway stations in Spain opened in 1854
Railway stations in Spain opened in 1983
Rodalies de Catalunya stations
1854 establishments in Spain